Popular games and sports in Pune include athletics, cricket, basketball, badminton, field hockey, football, tennis, kabaddi, paragliding, kho-kho, rowing and chess. The Pune International Marathon is an annual marathon conducted in Pune. The 2008 Commonwealth Youth Games were held in Pune.

History

Badminton
The beginnings of badminton can be traced to mid-19th-century Pune (then known as Poona). During a party, a few guests fastened feathers onto champagne corks and used the bottles as bats. They called this game Poonai. The first rules of the game were written in Pune in 1873, by the British.

Pune 7 Aces is the badminton team that represents the city in Premier Badminton League.

Cricket
Cricket is played between clubs affiliated with the Maharashtra Cricket Association, which maintains a domestic cricket team (the Maharashtra cricket team). This team, one of three based in the state of Maharashtra, competes in interstate matches and leagues such as the Ranji Trophy. Jawaharlal Nehru Stadium is where National and One Day International matches take place. It has been named after the First Prime Minister of Independent India, Pandit Jawaharlal Nehru.

An Indian Premier League cricket team based in Pune began play in 2011. A new stadium Subrata Roy Sahara Stadium built in Gahunje on the Mumbai–Pune expressway, inaugurated on 1 April 2012, is the home ground. The Subrata Roy Sahara Stadium has a seating capacity of 55,000 and is built on the Mumbai Pune Expressway. The team was named Pune Warriors India and was brought for Rs.1702 Crores or $370 million. It is the most expensive team in the Indian Premier League, and was owned by Sahara Group. The cost was a frequent concern for the team that lead to withdrawing prior to the 2012 season. The league helped fund the team so they could compete in the competition but eventually they folded following the 2013 season.

Blades of Glory, India's first cricket museum, is based in Pune, run by Rohan Pate, a former Maharashtra Under-19 cricketer, inaugurated during IPL V by Sachin Tendulkar and located in the quaint Sahakar Nagar.

Football

The Pune Football Club, also known as Pune FC, is a football club that plays in the Indian Football League. It was established in August 2007.

Basketball
Pune has basketball at the Deccan Gymkhana club and at Fergusson College. American coach J. D. Walsh held his first JDBasketball India camp in Pune.

American football
The Elite Football League of India (ELFI) – an American gridiron football competition slated for a fall 2012 kickoff – announced that the Pune Marathas will be a member-franchise.

When the Elite Football League of India was introduced in August 2011, Pune was noted as one of eight cities to be awarded a team for the inaugural season, although the team's games would be played in Balewadi. All 56 games of EFLI's opening season were to be played at the Shree Shiv Chhatrapati Sports Complex, which was retrofitted to host the sport. Named the Pune Marathas, it was Pune's first professional American football franchise.

Marathon
Pune International Marathon is an annual marathon foot-race held in Pune. The first edition of the race was begun in 1983, and the 20th edition was held in 2005. It attracts many international participants who compete with local and national runners in the distinct climate of the Indian subcontinent. It hosted the Asian Marathon Championship race in 2010.

Rugby
Pune has a rugby team, men's and women's, registered with the IRFU as Rugby Football Sports Pune (RFS Pune). As of November 2010, RFS Pune has qualified for First Division Rugby, while placing second in the Callaghan Cup held in Chennai in the same month. Pune offers much promise in this sport. The women's team has been the national cup holder for two consecutive years and thrice since the all India women's 7s 2009. To date, the Pune Women's team has 13 and counting India international players.

Kabaddi
Puneri Paltan is a Kabaddi team based in Pune that plays in the Pro Kabaddi League. The team is currently led by Deepak Niwas Hooda and coached by K.Bhaskaran. The team is owned by Insurekot Sports. Paltan play their home matches at the Shree Shiv Chhatrapati Sports Complex.

Darts
International darts player Ashfaque Sayed represented India for the PDC Worldcup telecast live on Ten Sports in 2007.

Derby
The land is controlled by the Indian Army. The racing season is from July to October every year. The Royal Western India Turf Club manages the race course. The course has two training tracks and two racing surfaces. Major racing events include the Pune Derby, RWITC Invitational, Independence Cup and Southern Command Cup.

Martial arts
Japan Karate-Do Nobukawa-Ha Shito-Ryu Kai India JKNSKI (Shito-Ryu Karate-Do Academy of India) is a direct branch of Japan Karate-Do Nobukawaha Shito-Ryu Kai recognised by Japan Karate-Do Federation. In India the academy is also approved by the Indian National Federation of Karate. The JKNSKI is headed by Naresh Sharma who is an international martial arts title holder and advanced dan grade in the Japanese martial arts.

Gliding
Gliding Centre Pune

The Gliding Centre is an undertaking of the Directorate General of Civil Aviation, Civil Aviation Department, Government of India. It uses two-seater sailplanes, LET L-23 Super Blanik and other LET gliding planes. The flying season starts in October and continues to May or early June. The club is closed during the monsoons. It is open Sunday to Thursday except public holidays, Sundays is an open day for joyrides, and Monday to Thursday are for training.

Others
Garware Balbhavan is a well known playground and a recreational center located in the heart of the Pune city. It has done meaningful work in the field of child development since 1985. Balbhavan is a living institute that seeks to make Pune India's first child-centric city. There are regular batches of roller skating at Balbhavan.

The National Education Foundation organises Enduro3, a cross country adventure race in Pune. It is normally a two- or three-day event with activities like cycling, trekking, river-crossing and rifle shooting. The city was host to the 2009 FIVB Men's Junior World Championship.

Teams

Sport institutions

Prominent sporting institutions in Pune include the Nehru Stadium, the Deccan Gymkhana, PYC Hindu Gymkhana, Maharashtra Cricket Association Cricket Stadium and Shree Shiv Chhatrapati Sports Complex.

The Nehru Stadium is the home ground of the Maharashtra cricket team, and has hosted many prominent cricket events, including one of the matches in the 1996 Cricket World Cup.

A new cricket stadium, Pune International Cricket Centre, is a premier cricket stadium in Gahunje on the Mumbai-Pune Expressway near Pune. This is the headquarters for the Maharashtra Cricket Association and home for the Maharashtra cricket team. It is a state-of-the-art stadium and the stadium also hosted the home matches of Sahara Pune Warriors, IPL team of Pune.

The Deccan Gymkhana has hosted Davis Cup tennis matches on several occasions. The facility at Balewadi hosted the National Games in 1994 as well as the 2008 Commonwealth Youth Games.

The Royal Connaught Boat Club is one of several boating clubs on the Mula-Mutha river.

Sports persons

Cricketers

 Ruturaj Gaikwad
 Hemu Adhikari
 Kedar Bhave
 Surendra Bhave
 Chandu Borde
 Ajay Chavan
 Soniya Dabir
 Pratik Desai
 D. B. Deodhar
 Ganesh Gaikwad
 Mahendra Gokhale
 Kedar Jadhav
 Hemant Kanitkar
 Hrishikesh Kanitkar
 Robert Mackenzie
 Arvind Mehendale
 Balkrishna Mohoni
 Rohit Motwani
 Parag More
 Sushil Nadkarni
 Ujwala Nikam
 Aniruddha Oak
 Arthur O'Bree
 Bal Pandit
 Cecil Paris
 Snehal Pradhan
 Chandrakant Raut
 Cyril Reed
 Chandra Sathe
 Mukund Sathe
 Lisa Sthalekar
 Yogesh Takawale
 Arati Vaidya

Hockey

 Dhanraj Pillay
 Vikram Pillay
 Eliza Nelson

Football

 Sandesh Gadkari
 Prakash Thorat
 Shrikanth Molangiri

Badminton

 Suman Deodhar
 Nikhil Kanetkar
 Aditi Mutatkar
 Kashmira Joglekar

Tennis

 Radhika Tulpule
 Gaurav Natekar 
 Nitin Kirtane
 Ashvarya Shrivastava

Shooting

 Anisa Sayyed

Table tennis

 Meena Parande
 Sujay Ghorpade

Chess

 Abhijit Kunte 
  Soumya Swaminathan
 Eesha Karavade
 Kruttika Nadig
 Prathamesh Mokal
 Amruta Mokal

Billiards

 Pankaj Advani
  Wilson Jones

Weightlifting

 Ganesh Mali

Adventure

 NK Mahajan

Swimming

 Amar Muralidharan
 Arjun Muralidharan

Kabaddi

 Nitin Ghule

Basketball

 Eban Hyams

References

Sport in Pune
Sport in Maharashtra